World Without End is a best-selling 2007 novel by Welsh author Ken Follett. It is the second book in the Kingsbridge Series, and is the sequel to 1989's The Pillars of the Earth.

World Without End takes place in the same fictional town as Pillars of the Earth — Kingsbridge — and features the descendants of some Pillars characters 157 years later. The plot incorporates two major historical events, the start of the Hundred Years' War and the Black Death. The author was inspired by real historical events relating to the Cathedral of Santa María in Vitoria-Gasteiz.

A television miniseries based on the novel aired worldwide in 2012. It premiered on Showcase in Canada on 4 September 2012; in the United States on Reelz Channel on 17 October 2012; on Channel 4 in the UK on 22 December, and on Star Movies in the Philippines in January 2013. The eight-part television event miniseries stars Cynthia Nixon, Miranda Richardson, Peter Firth, Ben Chaplin, Charlotte Riley, Sarah Gadon and Tom Weston-Jones. It was directed by Michael Caton-Jones who also directed the historical epic Rob Roy.

Plot summary 
The novel begins in the fictional city of Kingsbridge, England in the year 1327. Four children - Merthin, Caris, Gwenda, and Merthin's brother Ralph - head into the woods on All Hallows Day. Together the children witness two men-at-arms killed in self-defence by Sir Thomas Langley, aided by Ralph. The children then flee, with the exception of Merthin, who helps the wounded Sir Thomas bury a letter with instructions to dig up and deliver it if and when Sir Thomas should die. After this Sir Thomas flees to Kingsbridge and seeks refuge in the monastery, becoming a Benedictine monk, while the four children swear never to speak of what they saw.

During mass at All Hallows, Gwenda is forced by her father to steal the money that Sir Gerald was supposed to use to pay his debts to Kingsbridge Priory. Forced to default on these debts he is disgraced, his property confiscated and he and his wife are left as pensioners to the Priory. This disgrace drives their sons Merthin and Ralph to seek to regain the family's fortune and honour. Ralph is accepted as a squire under the Earl of Shiring, while Merthin is pushed to the far less prestigious role of apprenticing himself as a carpenter.

Ten years later, in 1337, Caris and Merthin are in love. When a section of the vault of the Kingsbridge Cathedral collapses Merthin, now an apprentice carpenter, shows his genius by developing a cheaper means of repair than his master.

Ralph, now a squire to Earl Roland of Shiring, provokes a fight and has his nose broken by a handsome peasant from Gwenda's village named Wulfric, for whom Gwenda has a hopeless infatuation. Gwenda is sold for a cow by her father to be prostituted at an outlaws' camp. She kills one of the outlaws while he is raping her, and escapes. She is followed by her buyer, but is able to drown him when the Kingsbridge bridge collapses, a tragedy that kills many, including all of Wulfric's immediate family and Prior Anthony of Kingsbridge (at the hands of Godwyn's mother). In the midst of the disaster Ralph saves Earl Roland's life and is rewarded with the lordship of Gwenda's village of Wigleigh.

Gwenda and Wulfric return to Wigleigh and attempt to gain Wulfric the inheritance of his father's land. The inheritance is eventually denied by Ralph because of the grudge he bears against Wulfric. Due to his poor prospects, Wulfric's beautiful wife-to-be, Annet, leaves him. By months of intensively showing Wulfric her love and devotion, Gwenda finally wins his love and they marry. Gwenda then tries to win Wulfric back his lands by having sex with Ralph, but Ralph does not uphold his end of the deal. Gwenda's first son, Sam, is conceived through this liaison.

Ralph, as lord, is merciless and brutal, and he winds up raping Annet as well. Wulfric does not permit this outrage to go unpunished, and lodges a complaint against Ralph with the Earl on her behalf; though English law of the time forbids rape regardless of the perpetrator's social status, it is very risky for peasants to sue their lord. Gwenda, despite her consternation at her husband's defence of his former sweetheart, helps by interceding with Lady Philippa about Ralph's case. Thanks to her intervention, Ralph is convicted of rape and is sentenced to hang, but with the Earl Roland's connivance, he manages to escape and becomes an outlaw. After robbing and murdering many people on the road to Kingsbridge, he is eventually captured with Merthin's help, and is once again set for execution, but since the king has declared war on France (launching the Hundred Years' War in May 1337) he is granted a royal pardon on condition that he fight in the war (in 1339, when Edward invades northeast France).

Meanwhile, the monastery's Sacrist, Godwyn, a nephew of Prior Anthony, outwits his opponents and wins the priory election in an overwhelming victory. Godwyn claims to be a reformer, but turns out to be even more conservative and quickly begins to clash with the townspeople on a number of issues, including the funding and building of a fabulous new bridge designed by Merthin and permitting the townspeople to full wool for a growing fabric industry. Caris, who becomes the de facto alderman, is a particular problem, leading the campaign to get for Kingsbridge the status of a Royal Borough and emancipate the townspeople from the Priory's control.  Despite being her cousin, Godwyn charges Caris with witchcraft hoping to have her executed to get her out of the way. To escape execution, Caris agrees to join the Kingsbridge nunnery. With his planned marriage to Caris thus denied, Merthin leaves Kingsbridge for Florence, Italy to pursue his building career. He becomes a highly successful and rich architect, and after hearing that Caris had taken nun's vows he marries Sofia, the daughter of one of his Italian clients.

Eight years later (in 1346), Godwyn steals money from the substantially more profitable nuns in order to build for himself a luxurious palace.  In July 1346, Caris seeks to petition the bishop to redress this theft. However, by this time the bishop has left for France with King Edward III. Caris travels to France with Mair, an attractive nun from the convent who has romantic feelings for Caris; during their travels they start an intimate relationship, although Caris feels guilty that she still cares more for Merthin. Along the way, Caris witnesses the ravages of the war and acts as a field nurse during the Battle of Crécy, during which Ralph, having fled charges of rape and murder in England, saves the life of the Prince of Wales and is rewarded with his lifelong dream of knighthood. Caris's errand is fruitless, however, as the bishop of Kingsbridge as well as Earl Roland have been killed in the battle.

In Florence, the city is ravaged by the Black Death, having arrived in Messina in 1347. Merthin and his entire family are stricken, he recovers in the spring of 1348 but his wife dies. He remembers his love for Caris and decides to return to Kingsbridge with his daughter Laura (Lolla). There he finds Caris unwilling to renounce her vows but the two go through a sporadic liaison. At the same time, Merthin re-establishes himself in the community by solving flaws left in the new bridge during its completion after his departure.

Soon after Merthin's return, the plague reaches Kingsbridge and thousands die, and the city quickly descends into anarchy; this includes Caris' intimate partner, Sister Mair. Godwyn loses his nerve and flees with the monks to an isolated chapel where he and all the monks die except for Gwenda's brother Philemon, who fled, and Thomas Langley. After the prioress of the nunnery dies Caris is elected Prioress and promoted acting Prior in the absence of Godwin, and she institutes the use of masks and cleanliness which help to protect the nuns from the plague. With social mores loosened under the devastating effect of the plague, Caris regularly breaks her vows as a nun and for some time lives openly with Merthin; the townspeople, grateful for Caris tireless efforts, tolerate this, as does the pragmatic Bishop who himself has a long-standing homosexual relationship with his archdeacon. But the returning Philemon starts denouncing Caris, who must drop Merthin in order to continue her monastic and medical work. The disappointed Merthin angrily tells her he would not wait any more, but would find another love.

After William, the new Earl of Shiring, dies from the plague along with all his male heirs, Ralph sees a chance to become Earl. After murdering his young wife Matilda (Tilly) he arranges his marriage to William's widow Lady Phillipa, whom he has long desired, and makes himself Earl. However Philippa spurns him and leaves for the Kingsbridge nunnery, where she and Merthin fall in love in 1350 and she conceives his child. Afraid of Ralph's wrath, Philippa seduces Ralph to make him believe the child is his. As a result, Merthin and Philippa cannot continue their liaison.

After two years, the plague dissipates and Caris renounces her vows, after finally being able to run her own independent hospital, and marries Merthin. After ten years of hardship, the people of Kingsbridge are granted a borough charter, freeing them from the lordship of the priory, and Merthin becomes alderman. Merthin also solves the long troublesome problem of why the vault of the cathedral collapsed by dismantling and rebuilding one of the towers which he redesigns to be the tallest building in England. Although Ralph continues to harbour a grudge against Wulfric, he is forced by the labour shortages caused by the plague to allow Wulfric to regain his father's land. When Sam, the secret son of Ralph, kills the local bailiff's son and is sentenced to death, Gwenda reveals his true parentage to Ralph to gain Sam's release. Armed with this knowledge, Ralph blackmails Gwenda into having sex with him again. When Sam walks in on this, there is struggle in which Sam and Gwenda kill Ralph. Davey, Gwenda's second son, negotiates a free tenancy and marries Amabel, the daughter of Wulfric's former wife-to-be, proving to Gwenda that her life has had some worth.

Gwenda's conniving brother Philemon becomes Prior of Kingsbridge and even tries to become Bishop, but his ambition is ruined after Sir Thomas Langley dies of old age. Merthin keeps his promise and digs up the letter which reveals that the deposed King Edward II had secretly survived and had taken the identity of one of his attackers. Merthin trades the letter to a member of the king's court in exchange for Philemon's departure from Kingsbridge forever.

As the plague comes back, Caris's intelligence, practical sense and determination allow the townspeople to subdue this second outbreak, making her the most popular and revered figure in Kingsbridge. Merthin completes his spire and succeeds in making Kingsbridge cathedral the tallest building in England. He tops the spire with a statue of an angel modelled on Caris.

Characters

Major characters
Merthin: A red-haired descendant of Jack Builder and Lady Aliena, the chief protagonists of The Pillars of the Earth. Variously known as Merthin Fitzgerald, Merthin Builder, and Merthin Bridger, Merthin is the eldest son of the disgraced knight Sir Gerald and Lady Maud. A clever young carpenter, builder, and architect, he uses his intellect to his advantage and has a lifelong love for Caris. He designs a radical new bridge before being forced to renounce Caris. Leaving for Italy, he becomes successful in Florence, at the time one of the biggest cities in Europe and a major center of Renaissance culture. After hearing that Caris had taken her definite vows, he marries the daughter of the city's richest families. However, Merthin's life in Florence is not described and his Italian wife is never seen onstage; Merthin's story is picked up only several years later, after his wife and her family are wiped out by the plague in Florence, whereupon he returns to Kingsbridge with his only daughter, Lolla, and establishes his authority as a master builder. He becomes Alderman of the town's guild, and eventually marries Caris. He builds a new hospital for Caris to run and a tower for Kingsbridge Cathedral, making it the tallest structure in England of that time.  In the TV adaptation he is played by Tom Weston-Jones.
Caris: The feisty daughter of Edmund Wooler – the Alderman of the parish guild, and a direct descendant of Tom Builder - Caris is one of the two main characters in the novel with Merthin, whom she loves truly and exclusively throughout her whole life. Since childhood she wants to be a doctor, though only men may be physicians. A determined and bright woman, she refuses to marry to keep her independence, although she and Merthin love each other deeply. Her rising influence in the town and her bid to free the merchants from the control of the priory brings her into conflict with the church, resulting in her being tried for witchcraft. She escapes the death sentence by entering the priory as a nun, thanks to the Prioress, Mother Cecilia. In charge of the hospital, she uses common sense and observation, and opposes the formerly undisputed authority of the monk - physicians. During the outbreaks of plague, Caris enforces hygiene practices to inhibit its spread and writes a catalogue of cures and good practices to avoid the spreading of contagious illnesses, which becomes coveted by pharmacists throughout England. She's elected Prioress of Kingsbridge after the death of Mother Cecilia and is promoted acting Prior when all the monks flee Kingsbridge for fear of the plague. She then renounces her vows, manages to run independently a new hospital and marries Merthin, who's by then the Alderman of the guild. After she successfully fights the plague a second time, she becomes revered in the whole town. In the TV adaptation she is played by Charlotte Riley.
Godwyn: An older cousin of Caris and monk at the Kingsbridge Priory, Godwyn gives the impression of a reformer as he maneuvers his election as Prior - with the help of his scheming mother, Petranilla. Unable to imaginatively solve the Priory's financial problems, Godwyn, with continued advice from his mother, and with Philemon's loyal assistance, resorts to more conservative tactics to protect his position and advance himself politically, usually at the expense of the town and of the associated nunnery. Dies of the plague as he attempts to isolate himself in the monastery's cell at St. John in the Forest. Ends his life having achieved very few of his aspirations despite his cruel efforts. In the TV adaptation he is played by Rupert Evans.
Gwenda: The daughter of landless laborers in the village of Wigleigh and sister to Philemon, as a small child she is taught by her father, Joby, to steal to save her family from starvation. She steals Sir Gerald's purse and therefore is partly responsible for his disgraced status and for the destiny of his two sons, Merthin and Ralph. She becomes estranged from her family when her father sells her to vagabonds for a cow. Though she never escapes poverty and tragedy, she uses her wits to better her situation and escape danger. Though not pretty and is described as "rat-like", Gwenda is sensual in her appearance and is both desired and despised by Ralph. Gwenda loves Wulfric, despite the fact that he is engaged to Annet and is a lifelong friend to Caris, despite the great difference in their social class. She is raped by Ralph and marries Wulfric once he cannot marry Annet. Gwenda rams her dagger into the dying Ralph's mouth to protect the secret that her son Sam, is Ralph's and not Wulfric's. In the TV adaptation, she is played by Nora von Waldstätten.
Ralph: Merthin's younger brother and complete opposite, he is a rapist and a murderer. A natural-born warrior, Ralph is selfish, ruthless, and will stop at nothing to become an Earl and redeem his family's disgrace. He holds his brother in great esteem and maintains a wish for his approval, although he rarely curtails his behavior in order to achieve it. Ralph has as a lifelong obsession with Lady Philippa, who becomes his second wife. He hates Wulfric for breaking his nose and for his lack of fear. Ralph is forced into exile after a trial for rape and becomes a feared outlaw, who is scheduled to hang. Ralph escapes death by going to war in France and saves Prince Edward, the Prince of Wales. Returns from war a knight, fulfilling lifelong goal of repairing family name; is eventually made Earl of Shiring. Realizing that Sam is his son, he blackmails Gwenda into having sex with him. He is killed by Gwenda, when Sam finds them together after protectively following his mother. In the TV adaptation, he is played by Oliver Jackson-Cohen.

Minor characters 
Thomas Langley: a Knight who arrives in Kingsbridge at the beginning of the book.  Together with Ralph, he kills two of the Queen Isabel's men after they attack him. He is injured in the fight and eventually loses his left arm at the elbow.  Together with Merthin, he buries a message at the base of the tree. Becomes a monk to avoid retribution and tells Merthin that if he hears of Thomas' death, to bring the letter to a priest. He is a friend to Merthin and Caris and a foil to many of Godwyn's actions. He captures Ralph and brings him to justice for his many crimes, although Ralph is later pardoned by the king. Thomas Langley dies in 1361 as an old monk, suffering symptoms of senility. Merthin completes his promise to dig up the letter and learns that King Edward II was not assassinated, but escaped and is hiding in exile.  Philemon also learned the secret, but Merthin outwits him and sells the letter to King Edward III in exchange for the promotion of Canon Claude to Bishop and sending Philemon to Avignon to be ambassador to the Pope.  In the TV adaptation he is played by Ben Chaplin.
Lady Philippa: Noblewoman and wife of Lord William of Caster, later Earl William of Shiring. She loathes Ralph from the moment he becomes a squire but after William and both of their sons die in the plague is forced by King Edward III to marry him. Soon after Ralph becomes earl, their mutual distaste for each other results in Philippa moving into the nunnery and a love affair with Merthin, by which she conceives a child. She seduces Ralph to convince him that the son Roley is his and avoid being killed for adultery. In the TV adaptation she is played by Sarah Gadon.
Wulfric: Attractive and hard-working; son of landed peasants of Wigleigh; hated by Ralph Fitzgerald because he does not let Ralph intimidate him; loses his birthright when family dies during the collapse of Kingsbridge bridge; town politics (and Ralph) keep him from earning back his family's land; becomes impoverished but happily married to Gwenda and has two sons (although, unbeknownst to him, one of them is not his, but Ralph's). He is eventually, much to Ralph's disgust, given back his family's land as the Plague has killed all others capable of farming the land. In the TV adaptation he is played by Tom Cullen.
Philemon (Holger Wigleigh): Ambitious monk, son of Joby and brother of Gwenda. For years he is Godwyn's loyal assistant. When the monks start to be wiped out by the Plague, he escapes and disappears for a long time. Eventually he succeeds Godwyn as Prior after he returns, when the Plague has run its course. Dishonest and shamelessly self-promoting, Philemon has a penchant for stealing trinkets and keeps them in a secret hiding place. He aspires to become Bishop of Shiring, but is rejected after Merthin bargains with the King's man with his letter from Thomas Langley. In the end, he becomes the royal emissary to the Pope and leaves Kingsbridge.
Elfric: Bitter and vindictive Master Carpenter, Builder. Son of an old, and more talented master, Joachim. He sees Merthin as a challenge to his status and livelihood and does everything possible to make his life difficult. While alive resists attempts to admit Merthin to the Guilds as he never finished his apprenticeship. Dies in the first outbreak of the Plague.  In the TV adaptation he is played by Ian Pirie.
Annet: Pretty and flirtatious, but dull; uses her feminine charms to sell her family's eggs at Kingsbridge market and attract Wulfric; attracts unwanted attention from Ralph Fitzgerald and is later raped by him.  Broke off her engagement to Wulfric when he is disinherited. Is never happy with life and eventually realizes the great mistake she made.  Throughout life Gwenda views her as an adversary as she keeps flirting with Wulfric. Eventually at the wedding of their children the two are reconciled as Gwenda realizes that she has won.
Mattie Wise: Kingsbridge's herbalist and midwife; leaves town abruptly when another citizen is accused of witchcraft; teaches young Caris healing arts and herbology; saves Gwenda's life when educated doctors and nuns fail to help her safely through delivering her first child; always instructs patients to pray to God, to avoid any claims of witchcraft or devil-conjuring. In the TV adaption she is played by Indira Varma.
Joby Wigleigh: lowest in Wigleigh social hierarchy; landless laborer; missing one hand from when caught stealing; lies, cheats, and steals to feed his family; sells his daughter Gwenda to outlaws for a cow.  In the TV adaptation he is played by Andre Hennicke.
Madge Webber: Only surviving member of the Webber family; honest but poor at the outset, Caris changes the family fortunes by contracting them to weave and make dyed cloth. Husband Mark was the first Kingsbridge resident to die of the plague, her sons also died. Later she remarries and has a daughter.  In the TV adaptation she is played by Sally Bankes.
Alice: Caris' sister; resents Caris; married to Elfric, who takes Merthin as an apprentice; tries to trap Merthin into marrying her stepdaughter, Griselda.
Griselda: Elfric's daughter from a previous marriage, seduces Merthin after her boyfriend Thurstan leaves town when he finds that she is pregnant. Attempts to make Merthin marry her to be a father to her child. Is frustrated by Caris as she finds that Griselda is several months along in her pregnancy and Merthin's liaison was only recent. Names her child Merthin out of spite, though all of the town realize that he is not Merthin's child.
Buonaventura Caroli; Italian wool merchant who trades in Kingsbridge; friend to Edmund, and later to Merthin when he lives in Florence; assists Caris in developing "Kingsbridge scarlet" quality bright red wool fabric; brings Caris news of Merthin after he has settled in Florence.
Lolla (Laura): Merthin's daughter by his Florentine wife; never contracts plague in Italy as a toddler and is so believed to be immune; brought to Kingsbridge by her father after whole family dies of plague.  Is a cause of consternation to Merthin for her rebelliousness in her teens and eventually decides to follow in Caris' steps as a healer, apprenticing herself to Caris in her hospital.
Bessie Bell: Tavern keeper's daughter; cares for Lolla and seduces Merthin when they return from Italy, before Merthin builds his own home. Dies in the first outbreak of the Plague and leaves the tavern to Merthin.
Mair: A young nun with a beautiful angel face, brief lover of Caris, with whom she travels to France, dies in first outbreak of the plague. In the TV adaption she is played by Tatiana Maslany.
Prior Anthony,: Uncle of Godwyn and Caris and Prior of Kingsbridge at the beginning of the book. Is killed in the collapse of the first bridge.
Prior Saul Whitehead:  Nephew of the Earl of Shiring, Prior of Saint-John-in-the-Forest, is initially chosen by the Earl to be the new Prior of Kingsbridge, but convinced not to run through Godwyn's manipulation.
Bishop Richard: younger son of Earl Roland, when still a young man he becomes bishop of Kingsbridge; he is practical, but not devout.  His lust gives Godwyn a weapon to use against him.  Dies at the Battle of Crécy.
Tilly: (Matilda of Tench): young aristocrat; educated by Kingsbridge nuns; married to Ralph in her early teens, gives Ralph one son (Gerald) before she is murdered by Ralph.
Henri of Mons, bishop of Kingsbridge: A good, intelligent and practical man, he is an unlikely ally of Caris' from her days as Prioress of Kingsbridge. Although the two have differences of opinion, he realizes that Caris is bright and successful. He has a relationship with his subordinate, Canon Claude, which Caris is aware of, but never divulges. He fights against Philemon when possible. He favours Caris and quickly becomes the key to the balance of powers in Kingsbridge.
Petranilla: Mother of Godwyn and sister of Edmund Wooler and Prior Anthony. She is very cunning. Her first husband dies before the events of the book take place. Closely advises Godwyn, sometimes against his will, and her plan leads to him winning the Prior election. Strongly dislikes her niece Caris. Dies in the first outbreak of plague. In the TV adaption she is played by Cynthia Nixon.
Edmund Wooler: Alderman of the Parish Guild and father of Caris and Alice. Brother of Petranilla and Prior Anthony. Carries on the family wool business after his father dies and his brother joins the Church. Often at odds with the Priors of Kingsbridge due to the fact that they don't often side with the interests of the townspeople.
Odila of Shiring, countess of Monmouth: Noblewoman, the only surviving child of Earl William of Shiring after the plague killed her brothers. She was then married to David of Caerleon, the young, new earl of Monmouth. As stepsister of Ralph's sons, her household will receive the young Gerald of Shiring as squire.
Mother Cecilia: Prioress for much of the book. Tough and strict, she is also very caring and well regarded. She saves Caris from being executed for witchcraft by suggesting she join the nunnery. She had a soft spot for Godwyn when he was younger, but grows to dislike him and distrust him when he rules that the monks and nuns must be physically separate (causing the nuns to lose significant access to the priory's facilities).  Later, she learns further how untrustworthy he is when he steals a large bequest from the nuns' funds to pay for the building of a new Prior's palace.  She dies in the first plague outbreak. In the TV adaption she is played by Miranda Richardson.
Elizabeth Clerk; Foil to Caris, bright and educated, beautiful; wants to marry Merthin and nearly seduces him, but is frustrated by Merthin's unrequited obsession with Caris; enters nunnery when Merthin refuses her; politically opposed to Caris in nunnery politics, based on prior grudge. In the TV adaption she is played by Caroline Boulton.
Friar Murdo: A meddlesome, psychotic charlatan who uses zealous piety to satisfy his desire to see women burned as witches. Provides crucial evidence that seems to assure Caris's guilt at her trial for witchcraft.  In the TV adaptation he is played by John Rado.
Earl Roland: the earl of Shiring; he and his sons acted as the Queen's henchmen in the assassination attempt of Edward II. In the TV adaptation is played by Peter Firth.
Sir Gerald and Lady Maude. Parents of Merthin and Ralph. Formerly of gentry, owning some villages, but on becoming bankrupt they settle to live as pensioners of the monastery. Gerald is related to the Earls of Shiring - being a remote descendant of Tommy, the son of Jack and Aliena in Pillars of the Earth. His son Ralph becoming Earl of Shring gives Gerald a sense of fulfillment in his old age.

Reception 

World Without End soon after its release rapidly reached the top of The New York Times Best Seller list. and remained on the list for 30 weeks, and was a hit around the world.

Reviewer Bernard  O'Keefe wrote: "The writings of Ken Follett and of Ayn Rand are different from each other in nearly every possible way. Follett is an outspoken champion of the Working Class and the British Labour Party, Rand idealized Capitalist "Robber Barons" and advocated the most extreme of Free market economics. Follett wrote spy thrillers and surprised readers and critics by turning to historical fiction and doing it well. Rand was a philosophical writer and her characters were meant to represent and embody abstract philosophical principles. Nevertheless, there are remarkable similarities of plot between Rand's The Fountainhead and Follet's World Without End. Rand's Howard Roark is a brilliant young architect who must wage a hard fight against hide-bound mediocre rivals before becoming established in 20th-century New York. Follet's Merthin is a brilliant young architect who must wage a hard fight with a hide-bound mediocre rival before becoming established in Medieval England. Roark's beloved Dominique spends many years married successively to two other men, and only on her second divorce can Roark marry her and live happily ever after. Merthin's beloved Carris spends many years as a cloistered nun, and only on her being released from her vows can Merthin marry her and live happily ever after. Rand's book ends with Roark and his bride standing on top of his greatest work  - the highest skyscraper in all New York. Follet's book ends with Merthin and his bride standing on top of his greatest work - the tallest spire in all England."

Historical references
 The reign of King Edward III provides the historical setting for the novel.
 The structural problems that force a rebuilding of the tower at Kingsbridge cathedral were modeled after an incident at the old cathedral of the Spanish town of Vitoria-Gasteiz (from the author's Acknowledgements).
 Merthin's target in his quest to build the tallest church spire in England was Salisbury Cathedral.
 The chapters taking place in France include accurate descriptions of the Battles of Blanchetaque and Crécy. Though the book has no French viewpoint characters, the plot device of Caris along with Sister Mair finding themselves inadvertently among the French soldiers, disguised as boys, makes it possible to describe the battles from both the English and the French points of view. 
 Although all the action in England occurs in the fictional towns of Kingsbridge and Shiring, actual locales such as Melcombe (depicted as the main port used by the Kingsbridge merchants), Gloucester, Monmouth, Shaftesbury, Exeter, Winchester and Salisbury are in the same vicinity. This places the setting somewhere in south-central England.
 The Earls of Monmouth are often referenced as having many dealings (and at least two marriage alliances) with the Earls of Shiring. In historical fact, the title was only created in the 17th century and there were no such earls at the time in which World Without End is set.
 The mysterious buried letter, whose contents are revealed only near the end of the novel, is similar in many ways to the historical Fieschi Letter.

The Kingsbridge Series
The Pillars of the Earth is the first novel of a series of four books by Follet. Two sequels were published: World Without End (2007) and A Column of Fire (2017). A prequel to Pillars, The Evening and the Morning was published in 2020.

Television adaptation

A television adaptation, produced by Scott Free and Tandem Communications, adapted by John Pielmeier, and directed by Michael Caton-Jones was broadcast in the United Kingdom in 2013.

References

2007 British novels
British historical novels
Cathedrals in fiction
Novels by Ken Follett
Novels set in the Middle Ages
Sequel novels
Novels set in the 14th century
Novels set in England
Novels about the Black Death
Hundred Years' War literature
Edward III of England